High School (TV series) may refer to:

 High School (2012 TV series), a 2012 television documentary series
 High School (2022 TV series), a 2022 television series

See also
High School (disambiguation)
The High School (disambiguation)